Qais Hameed is a former Iraqi football forward who played for Iraq between 1962 and 1966. He played 13 matches and scored 2 goals.

Career statistics

International goals
Scores and results list Iraq's goal tally first.

References

Iraqi footballers
Iraq international footballers
Living people
Association football forwards
Year of birth missing (living people)